Diuris orientis, commonly called the wallflower orchid or eastern wallflower orchid, is a species of orchid which is endemic to eastern Australia. Like others in the genus Diuris, it has two ear-like petals and is similar to the common donkey orchid (Diuris corymbosa) of Western Australia with which it has been confused. This species is found in New South Wales, Victoria, South Australia and Tasmania and its stalk-like petal "claw" is shorter in than those of D. corymbosa.

Description

The petals are erect and spread, ear-like above the flower. (The claw in the similar Western Australian Diuris corymbosa is longer.) There is a callus near the base of the mid-lobe, consisting of a narrow, yellow ridge. Flowering usually occurs between September and November.

Taxonomy and naming
Diuris orientis was first formally described in 1998 by David Jones from a specimen collected at Beauty Point in Tasmania. The description was published in Australian Orchid Research. The specific epithet (orientis) is a Latin word meaning "east", referring to the easterly distribution of this species, compared to other orchids in the Diuris corymbosa complex.

Distribution and habitat
The eastern wallflower orchid is widely distributed in South Australia, Tasmania and Victoria. In New South Wales it is only found in the far south east, in and near the Nadgee Nature Reserve. In Victoria it is fairly common in open forest and heath. There is a dramatic increase in the flowering of this species after summer bushfires.

References

orientis
Orchids of New South Wales
Orchids of Victoria (Australia)
Orchids of South Australia
Orchids of Tasmania
Flora of New South Wales
Plants described in 1998